Region of Durham Paramedic Service provides emergency medical services to Durham Region in Ontario, Canada.

The service has 315 paramedics in eleven EMS stations throughout the region. The service began in 2000 and replaced six different contractors to the Ontario Ministry of Health.

Operations

There are 11 EMS stations located across Durham Region:

 Whitby Paramedic Station & EMS Headquarters - 4040 Anderson Street
 Oshawa (North) Paramedic Station - 1260 Wilson Rd. N.
 Oshawa (South) Paramedic Station - 497 Bloor Street East
 Courtice Paramedic Station - 2701 Courtice Road
 Bowmanville Paramedic Station - 9 St. George Street South
 Beaverton Paramedic Station - 343 Bay Street, PO Box 59
 Ajax Paramedic Station - 175 Hunt Street
 Pickering Paramedic Station - 1103 Kingston Road
 Uxbridge Paramedic Station - 4 Campbell Drive
 Port Perry Paramedic Station - 1775 Reach Street
 Sunderland Paramedic Station - S1050 Durham Regional Rd 10

Fleet

 41 Type III Ambulances - Ford E-Series 26 front line and 15 spare
 7 rapid response vehicles - Chevrolet Tahoe SUV
 1 emergency response and command unit - Chevy Tahoe SUV
 1 logistics van - Chevy Express
 1 emergency support unit Dodge Ram Van
 3 administrative support units
 3 EMS Command Vehicles staffed by Superintendents (either ACP or PCP status)

See also 

Paramedicine in Canada
List of EMS Services in Ontario
Paramedics in Canada
Emergency Medical Services in Canada

Emergency Services in Durham Region
Durham Regional Police Service
Fire Services in Durham Region
PARA-Marine Search and Rescue

References
 Durham Region Emergency Medical Services
http://www.durham.ca/health.asp?nr=/departments/health/durhamems/
Ambulance services in Canada
Regional Municipality of Durham